Paps may refer to:

Geography
Breast-shaped hill, commonly named paps
Paps of Anu
Paps of Fife
Paps of Jura
Paps of Lothian (disambiguation)
Maiden Paps (disambiguation)

Other uses
Paparazzi, a kind of photojournalist
Papilloma, a wart
PAPS, 3'-phosphoadenosine-5'-phosphosulfate
Emanuele Cozzi, an Italian dance musician of Paps 'n' Skar

See also
Pap of Glencoe
PAP (disambiguation)